Blenina senex is a moth of the family Nolidae. It is found in Taiwan, Korea and Japan.

The wingspan is 38–43 mm.

References

Moths described in 1878
Bleninae
Moths of Japan